The Plymouth Notch Cemetery in Plymouth Notch, Vermont, is noted as the burial place for 30th President of the United States Calvin Coolidge, as well as his wife Grace, children (Calvin Coolidge, Jr. 1908–1924, John Coolidge 1906–2000), and other members of the Coolidge family.

Other notable burials include Howard E. Armstrong, who served as Secretary of State of Vermont from 1949 to 1965, and abolitionist Achsa W. Sprague.

References

External links

 
 Calvin Coolidge Gravesite – PresidentsUSA.net
 
 

Cemeteries in Vermont
Buildings and structures in Windsor County, Vermont
Calvin Coolidge
Coolidge family
Tourist attractions in Windsor County, Vermont
Tombs of presidents of the United States